The dinar was the currency of the Republika Srpska between 1992 and 1994, during and following the Bosnian War. There were two distinct currencies issued by the National Bank of the Republika Srpska. The first was introduced in 1992 in conjunction with the Yugoslav dinar of that year, to which it was equal. The second was introduced on 1 October 1993, replacing the first at a rate of one million to one and matching the revaluation of the Yugoslav currency. Following this, the Republika Srpska used Yugoslav currency (first the "1994 dinar" and then "novi dinar") until 1998, when the convertible mark was introduced.

The two currencies were only issued in note form, with the first issued in denominations of 10 dinars up to 10 billion dinars and the second in denominations of 5000 dinars up to 50 billion dinars. The designs of the banknotes varied very little within the issues of the two currencies. The "1992 dinar" notes featured the arms of the republic on both sides, whilst the "1993 dinar" notes had a portrait of Petar Kočić on the obverse. Some of the issues in 1993 were overprints on 1992 banknotes.

See also

 Yugoslav dinar
 Krajina dinar
 Croatian dinar
 Bosnia and Herzegovina dinar
 Hyperinflation

dinar
History of Republika Srpska
Currencies of Europe
Modern obsolete currencies
1992 establishments in Europe
1998 disestablishments in Europe
1990s economic history